Sindh Engro Coal Mining Company (SECMC) is a joint venture corporation between the Government of Sindh, Hubco and Engro Corporation founded in 2009 tasked to mine and establish power projects from the Block II of the Thar coalfield in Tharparkar. Government of Sindh owns 51% of the company.

SECMC projects include's under construction 660MW of power plant when completed in 2017. Its flagship project is based on 75:25 debt to equity ratio. The company raised $900 million from Chinese banks, $300 million from a Pakistani banking consortium and the remaining $400 million from sponsors. SECMC is establishing another 600MV plant in partnership with State Power Investment Corporation.

It would in total produce 3,960MW of electricity, in six phases, from the coal in Block II of the project. The first phase of 660MW would be completed within three and a half years, while a new unit of 660MW each would be added subsequently. A sum of $1.6 billion with $800 million component for the open pit mining and $800 million for the power plant have been invested in the project.

References

Coal in Sindh
Companies of Pakistan
Dawood Hercules Corporation
Energy companies established in 2009
Energy in Sindh 
Pakistani companies established in 2009